The Eisenhut is a mountain in the Central Eastern Alps located in Austria. At , it is the highest peak of the Gurktal Alps and the Carinthian-Styrian Alps.

Geography 
It is located northeast of the Turracher Höhe Pass. Administratively the mountain belongs to the Austrian state of Styria, near the tripoint with Carinthia and Salzburg. The name refers to the centuries-long mining for iron ore in places like nearby Turrach.

References

Two-thousanders of Austria
Mountains of the Alps
Mountains of Styria